WSUF (89.9 FM) is a radio station licensed to Noyack, New York and serves the eastern Long Island and southeastern Connecticut areas.  It is owned by Sacred Heart University.

It broadcasts a news/talk radio and classical music format that includes programming from NPR, Public Radio International, and American Public Media.  For most of the time, it acts as a full satellite of WSHU, though on Sunday mornings and afternoons it simulcasts WSHU-FM's classical programming.

The station was assigned the WSUF call letters by the Federal Communications Commission on October 1, 1993.

Translators

See also 
 WSHU (AM) — 1260 AM, licensed to Westport, Connecticut
 WSHU-FM — 91.1 FM, licensed to Fairfield, Connecticut

References

External links 
  — includes WSUF schedule

Sacred Heart University
WSUF
Public Radio International stations
SUF
SUF
Radio stations established in 1993
Mass media in Suffolk County, New York
Southampton (town), New York
1993 establishments in New York (state)